The 2018 São Tomé and Principe Championship is the 33rd season of the São Tomé and Principe Championship the top-level football championship of São Tomé and Principe.

There are two separate championships, one for teams of São Tomé Island and one for teams of Príncipe Island. The champions of the two island championships play a home-and-away two-legged final to decide the overall champions.

Regional Leagues

São Tomé
Final table.

Selected results
São Tomé's played their next top tier match in a few decades, they suffered their first two losses, first to Agrosport, then to Neves, at the third round, they made a 1-0 win over Vitória Riboque their next at the top tier in decades. The first of three matches that were ăto play on May 5, Folha Fede vs. Aliança Nacional and Caixão Grande and Agrosport were abandoned in the middle of the second half due to heavy rain, they continued on May 9, the first ended in a three goal draw, the second Agrosport won.  The third one was Sporting

Príncipe
Final table.

National final

First Leg [Dec 8, Estádio Regional 13 de Junho, Santo António]

Porto Real        2-2  UDRA

Second Leg [Dec 15, Estádio Nacional 12 de Julho, São Tomé]

UDRA              2-1  Porto Real

UDRA win 4-3 on aggregate

References

Football competitions in São Tomé and Príncipe
Sao Tome and Principe
Championship